Terellia serratulae is a species of tephritid  or fruit flies in the family Tephritidae.

Description
This bluish clear-winged fruit fly has a hairy abdomen with a chequered black pattern. The apex of the antennae is reddish or yellow-orange. In the females the length of the ovopositor corresponds approximately to the length of the last three abdominal segments (tergites).

The females deposit eggs into the opened thistle flowerheads. The young larvae start feeding on the achenes of thistles (mainly Cirsium and Carduus species), but they do not induce gall-forming. They develop in the flower-heads (capitulum) of thistles in a cocoon of silk and plant hairs (pappus). This univoltine species overwinters in the larval stage. Adults are on the wing from July to September.

Distribution and habitat
This species can be found around thistles in most of Europe, in the eastern Palearctic realm, in the Near East, and in North Africa.

References

External links
 LES TEPHRITIDES (TRYPETIDES)

Tephritinae
Diptera of Europe
Insects described in 1758
Taxa named by Carl Linnaeus